was a Japanese breaststroke swimmer and the first Japanese woman to earn a gold medal in the Olympics.

Maehata was born in Hashimoto, Wakayama, as the daughter of a tofu producer and as a child learned to swim in the Kinokawa River. In the fifth grade of elementary school, she set an unofficial youth record for the 50-meter breaststroke. She went on to win numerous competitions, and was sponsored to attend a women’s boarding school in Nagoya which specialized in swimming, but the sudden death of her parents in 1931 forced her return home. Yet she was selected for the Japanese Olympic swimming team for the 1932 Summer Olympics in Los Angeles, and won the silver medal in the 200 m breaststroke event. She lost to Clare Dennis a mere 0.1 of a second.

During the post-Olympic celebration after her return to Japan, she stated that she was considering to retire from competitive swimming due to family issues, but then Tokyo mayor Hidejirō Nagata reportedly asked her why she did not bring back a gold medal. Over the next four years, Maehata trained very hard, and set a new world record for the 200-meter breaststroke on September 30, 1933.

During the 1936 Berlin Olympics, Maehata competed in a dead heat against the reigning German national champion, Martha Genenger, winning the gold medal for the Women's 200 m breaststroke by over one second. Despite the time difference, the race was broadcast live in Japan by NHK Radio.

In 1937, Maehata married Masahiko Hyodo, a professor of the medical school of Nagoya University, and retired from competition. She was awarded the Purple Ribbon of Merit by the Japanese government in 1964 and inducted into the International Swimming Hall of Fame in 1979. She suffered from a cerebral hemorrhage in 1983, which killed both her parents, but recovered. In 1990 she was designated a Person of Cultural Merit, the first sportswoman in Japan to receive such an honor. She died of acute renal failure in 1995.

See also
 Idaten (TV series)
 Japan at the 1932 Summer Olympics
 Japan at the 1936 Summer Olympics
 List of members of the International Swimming Hall of Fame

References

Further reading

 Pieroyh, Doris. Their Day in the Sun: Women of the 1932 Olympics. University of Washington Press (1996) 
 Lohn, John. Historical Dictionary of Competitive Swimming. Scarecrow Press, (2010).

External links 
 
 
 

1914 births
1995 deaths
People from Hashimoto, Wakayama
Sportspeople from Wakayama Prefecture
Olympic swimmers of Japan
Olympic gold medalists for Japan
Olympic silver medalists for Japan
Swimmers at the 1932 Summer Olympics
Swimmers at the 1936 Summer Olympics
Japanese female breaststroke swimmers
World record setters in swimming
Medalists at the 1932 Summer Olympics
Medalists at the 1936 Summer Olympics
Academic staff of Nagoya University
Olympic gold medalists in swimming
Olympic silver medalists in swimming
Recipients of the Medal with Purple Ribbon
20th-century Japanese women